Tertia Stella Power (27 June 1896 – 16 January 1977) was an Australian soprano.

Early life and education 
Power was born in Camperdown, Victoria, to customs officer Edward John Power and Annie Elizabeth Power, née O'Brien.

She was an early student of Nellie Melba at her school of singing in Albert Street, East Melbourne and was given the name "the Little Melba" by Melba herself.

Career 
She travelled to the United States in 1918, to join Melba. She made her American debut in Philadelphia, then sang with the Boston Symphony Orchestra, conducted by Mischa Elman. Her tour ended in Los Angeles. While in the USA, she was recorded by Thomas A. Edison, Inc., and on a later tour of England she was recorded by His Master's Voice. Her London debut was on 23 November 1919, when she appeared at the Royal Albert Hall with Landon Ronald's orchestra. In 1926 she returned to the USA on a ten-year contract to Paramount Pictures to sing in picture theatres, touring for 45 weeks a year and performing four or five shows every day.

In 1937 she gave live concerts on ABC radio 3AR with fellow-Melburnian Frederick Collier.

Personal 
Power married William O'Rourke at St Patrick's Cathedral, Melbourne on 17 December 1918. She received a monogrammed suitcase as a wedding gift from Dame Nellie Melba.

They had one son, known as Billy.

Power died at Charman Private Hospital in Cheltenham, Victoria. Survived by her son, she was buried at the Cheltenham Memorial Cemetery.

References 

1896 births
1977 deaths
Australian sopranos
Singers from Victoria (Australia)